Demetrius of Liubar or Liubartas (also Lubart, Lubko, Lubardus, baptized Dmitry; died ) was Prince of Lutsk and Liubar (Volhynia) (1323–1383), Prince of Zhytomyr (1363–1374), Grand Prince of Volhynia (1340–1383), Grand Prince of Halych–Volhynia (1340–1349).

Biography
Liubartas was the youngest son of Gediminas, Grand Duke of Lithuania. In the early 1320s he married a daughter of Andrew of Galicia and ruled Lutsk with Liubar (today town in Zhytomyr Oblast) in eastern Volhynia. After Andrew and his brother Leo II died around 1322, Galicia–Volhynia did not have a male successor. Instead of promoting Liubartas and causing a war with Poland, Gediminas compromised with Ladislaus the Short. Both parties agreed to install Yuri II Boleslav, nephew of Leo and Andrew.

Boleslaw-Yuri was a son of Trojden I, Duke of Masovia from the Piast dynasty, a cousin of Władysław I, and nephew of Gediminas' son-in-law Wenceslaus of Płock. At the time Boleslaw was fourteen years old and was betrothed to Eufemija, daughter of Gediminas. Liubartas continued to rule Lutsk and Volodymyr. That way the Galicia–Volhynia Wars were postponed until after Boleslaw's poisoning in 1340. He was poisoned by rebellious nobles, who invited Liubartas to become the ruler for both Galicia and Volhynia. Sources are too scarce to fully reconstruct events between 1341–1349.

Despite the support from his brothers Algirdas and Kęstutis, Liubartas lost all territories except for eastern Volhynia with Lutsk to Casimir III of Poland in 1349. In 1351 he was even taken prisoner during a battle, and Kęstutis had to rescue him. In 1366 a treaty was signed: Liubartas retained eastern Volhynia with Lutsk, while Poland got western Volhynia and Galicia. However the matter was settled only in 1370: Liubartas took advantage of Casimir's death and captured all of Volhynia. The territories changed again only in 1569, when Volhynia, including Lutsk, was transferred to Poland by the Union of Lublin.

In 1382, after death of Louis I of Hungary, Liubartas captured Kremenets, Przemyśl, and other cities from Hungary. He supported his brother Kęstutis against nephew Jogaila during the succession fights. He built a castle in Lutsk, known as the Lubart's Castle, that survives to this day. Liubartas died , having ruled Volhynia for roughly sixty years. He married for the second time  to an unnamed daughter of Konstantin of Rostov, a relative of Simeon of Moscow.

Family
 1321/23 married Hanna-Buch (Euphemia), princess of Volhynia, daughter of Andrew of Galicia
 1350 married daughter of 
 Fedor/ (~1351–1431)
 Lazar (died after 1386)
 Semen (died after 1386)
 Demetrius, presumably ancestor of the Sanguszko

See also 
 Family of Gediminas – family tree of Liubartas
 List of Ukrainian rulers

References

14th-century births
1384 deaths
People from Galicia–Volhynia
Princes of Halych
Gediminids